Martin Leon Vogel (born 22 October 1949) is a former South African rugby union player.

Playing career
Vogel played provincial rugby for the Free State. His only appearance in a test match was as a replacement in the second test against the 1974 touring Lions team of Willie John McBride at the Loftus Versfeld in Pretoria. Vogel replaced Dawie Snyman after 35 minutes in the second half, after Snyman himself replaced Ian McCallum 6 minutes earlier. Vogel played centre for the last five minutes of the test, with the starting centre, Jackie Snyman, moving to fullback.

Test history

See also
List of South Africa national rugby union players – Springbok no. 471

References

1949 births
Living people
South African rugby union players
South Africa international rugby union players
Free State Cheetahs players
People from Aliwal North
Rugby union players from the Eastern Cape
Rugby union wings